Adriatik Llalla is an Albanian lawyer. He served as the Prosecutor General of the Republic of Albania between 2012 and 2017. During the years 2008 to 2012 He was Inspector General of the High Inspectorate of Control and Audit of Assets and Conflict of Interest HIDAACI.

Biography

Background and personal life
Mr. Adriatik Llalla was born on October 9, 1969 at the village of Llalla to Sulova province, Gramsh, Albania, where he was raised in middle-class family. He is the youngest of five children of Xhemal and Sanije Llalla. He grew up in a family persecuted by the communist dictatorship. His father Xhemal Llalla (1920-2001) graduated from Harry Fultz American School of agronomy, initially worked in Pristina, Kosovo. He returned to his homeland during World War II and took part in the national liberation movement as commander of Sulova company. Mr.Xhemal Llalla was sentenced by the communist dictatorship in 1947 to life in prison, he was suspected as a CIA agent seeking to overthrow the communist regime, other family members were imprisoned and interned. Xhemal Llalla was an activist of the democratic movements after the 1990s. He was the President of the Association of Convicts and Political Persecuted of Gramsh district and a member of the national leadership of this association. His grandfather Haxhi Llalla (1890-1933) was an intellectual engaged in the learning the Albanian language at the Gramsh area, he conducted the first census in the Gramsh area. He was activist of the patriotic movements of that period supporter of Fan Noli's politic ideas. His mother Sanije Llalla (Xhika) housewife was from village of Gostime, Elbasan. Her family of origin was also persecuted during the communist dictatorship, her father Bajram Xhika was killed without trial at the 1945s along with many well-know names of Elbasan District. The Llalla family in 1994 settled in the capital of Albania, Tirana. Mr.Adriatik Llalla since 1999 is married to Ardjana Llalla (Mema) together they have three children.

Education and professional career
Mr.Adriatik Llalla studied at the Faculty of Law, University of Tirana and in 1997 graduated in law. During the years 2009-2011 he completed the studies "Second level Master" for criminal sciences, at the Department of Criminal Law Faculty, University of Tirana. At 2012 he received the title "Advocate" at the National Chamber of Advocacy Tirana. Mr.Adriatik Llalla during the years 2014-2017 completed his doctoral studies PhD "Doctorate in Criminal Sciences", at the Department of Criminal Law, Faculty of Law, University of Tirana. He has participated in many trainings of the School of Magistrates and various conferences inside and outside the country. He is the author of several articles in various media such as declaration and audit of assets, conflict of interest and criminal field. Mr.Adriatik Llalla started his professional career in January 1998 as Judicial Police Officer in the Lushnja District Prosecutor's Office. In January 1999 he was appointed Prosecutor in the Lushnja Prosecutor's Office. In 2002 he was transferred Prosecutor in the Kavaja Prosecutor's Office. Mr.Llalla in 2002 was appointed Head Prosecution of the Fier Prosecutor's Judicial District. He moved on as deputy head prosecutor in the Tirana judiciary district in 2005–2008. He joined the Prosecutorial Council in 2006 which he then chaired in 2007–2008. Mr.Adriatik Llalla has been voted twice at the Albanian Parliament with consensus of all politic parties. The Assembly of Albania with consensus of all political forces on October 9, 2008 approved the decree of the President the Republic for appointment of Mr.Adriatik Llalla Inspector General of the High Inspectorate of Declaration and Audit of Assets HIDDA. Mr.Llalla on May 4, 2010 was elected as Chairman of the Network of Integrity Experts, part of which are the institutions responsible for preventing conflict of interest and declaration and audit os assets for the countries of South-Eastern Europe and several other European countries. The Assembly of Albania, on December 8, 2012 approved the decree of the President of the Republic for the appointment Mr.Adriatik Llalla General Prosecutor of the Republic of Albania. Mr.Llalla's mandate as Attorney General ends on December, 2017. Mr.Adriatik Llalla on February 12, 2018 resigned from justice system.

Debate with the US Ambassador in Tirana and the decision of the US State Department
Mr.Llalla from February 2017 onwards was involved in a public debate with the US Ambassador to Tirana Donald Lu regarding the process of reforming justice system in the country for interfering in investigative processes and corruption. One year after of the start of this public debate on February 14, 2018 the US State Department banned Adriatik Llalla and his family from entering the USA on grounds that he was suspected of being involved in significant corruption. The US State Department in response to the request of the Albanian prosecution if in the USA there were investigations launched against Llalla or his family and if they had data on concrete cases of corruption who answered that: in the USA there are no investigations initiated against Llalla and his family We also do not concrete cases of corruption, but the decision of State Department to ban Llalla and his family in the USA was taken on the basis of public opinion that he is involved in corruption. Adriatik Llalla is the first citizen in the world to be barred from entering the United States under this law.

The prosecution investigations and the trial process
On March 14, 2018 the Prosecution started investigations against Llalla for several serious criminal offenses such as; corruption of judges and prosecutors, money laundering, abuse of office, failure to declare money at the borders. At the end of the 2-year investigation, the special prosecutor's office immediately dismissed all these accusations against Llalla and accused him of the criminal offense of false declaration of assets. The accusation was based on suspicions that Llalla had bought the properties at a higher price than the one reflected in the notary contracts. On September 22, 2021 the anti-corruption Court of Appeals sentenced Llalla for "false declaration of assets" with 2 years in prison, seizure 2.2 hectares of agricultural land, an apartment in the city of Durres, as well as an exemption for 5 years in the exercise of public functions. The court rejected Llalla's request for the suspension of the execution of the sentence due to his serious health problems. The health condition has been very serious lately on September 7, 2021 Llalla left Albania for treatment abroad. Mr.Adriatik Llalla had never admitted the charges against him, stating that every action he took was legal and that the decision his sentence has been taken before the investigation and trial began.

On December 13, 2021, Llalla was arrested in Italy.

References

Living people
20th-century Albanian lawyers
21st-century Albanian lawyers
Prosecutors general of Albania
People from Gramsh, Elbasan
University of Tirana alumni
Political scandals in Albania
1969 births